The Great Bertsolari Championship (Bertsolari Txapelketa Nagusia) is a championship among bertsolaris from all over the Basque Country. It is contested every four years and the current 2022 champion is Maialen Lujanbio.

History
It was first organized by Euzko Gaztedi in 1935 and 1936. Then there was a hiatus of the Spanish Civil War and its subsequent repression. Euskaltzaindia took some years of organizational responsibility in 1960, 1962, 1965, and 1967. The next, with a thirteen-year break, were held in 1980 and 1982, and Xabier Amuriza won both. Although he was a Biscayan, he sung in Standard Basque, breaking the mold, and since then established the bases for modern bertsolaritza. Since 1986, the Basque Association of Friends of the Basque Country has organized the championship every four years.

Winners

References

External links
http://www.rtve.es/alacarta/videos/fiesta/fiesta-bertsolaris-poetas-populares-vascos/3706444/
https://www.bertsozale.eus/eu/bertsolari-txapelketa-nagusia

Singing competitions
Bertsolaris
Verse contests
1935 introductions
Quadrennial events